The Capital Connection is a long-distance commuter train operated by KiwiRail between Palmerston North and the capital city of Wellington on the North Island Main Trunk. In 2018 the service faced funding issues, but the Government ensured that the service would continue, with the NZTA and regional councils investing in subsidies and the replenishment of rolling stock.

The modernisation and replacement of the service has been included in Horizons' 2021-2031 Regional Land Transport Plan. The service would be replaced by a modern and more frequent service with a larger train fleet.

History 
The service started on Monday 15 April 1991 as the Cityrail Express, with "Cityrail EXPRESS Palmerston North – Wellington" emblazoned on carriage sides.

Historic threats to the service
Concerns were raised that once the Kapiti Line services were extended north from Paraparaumu to Waikanae, the Capital Connection would lose passengers. In 2010 KiwiRail stated it would consider changes after evaluating what impact the metro system has on the Capital Connection's patronage. The extension to Waikanae was opened in 2011. By July 2012 the future of the service seemed to be very uncertain.
KiwiRail announced it would make a decision on the service in August 2012. Patronage dropped by 26,000 trips per annum (from 185,472 trips in the 2008–09 financial year to 159,641 in the 2011–12 financial year.)

The Greater Wellington Regional Council and the Horowhenua District Council proposed partial funding but needed the NZ Transport Agency (NZTA) to agree to continue the service. NZTA's public transport funding criteria require that a service must reduce traffic on a congested road. In August 2012 Greater Wellington Regional Council and Horizons (Manawatū-Whanganui Regional Council) proposed a business case for a subsidy which was evaluated by NZTA.

The business case argued that:
 Greater Wellington Regional Council should integrate the service and its rolling stock into its Metlink service;
 A $311,000 subsidy from NZTA and $216,000 subsidy from Greater Wellington and Horizons Regional Council (to be shared proportionate to patronage) be paid to KiwiRail;
 These subsidies to continue for five years.

In March 2013 the Member of Parliament for Palmerston North, Iain Lees-Galloway, presented a petition of 2,000 signatures supporting the service at a parliamentary select committee hearing. In May 2014 he said that he was not surprised at the drop in patronage following a fare rise.

In April 2013 KiwiRail said to keep the service operating, it would have increased ticket prices by 40 percent, and have at least 61 passengers on board in each direction. But it only increased fares by 10% from May.

On 1 July 2015, KiwiRail confirmed, that funding had been approved by Horizons Regional Council and the Greater Wellington Regional Council signing off their Long Term plans, including a subsidy for the service for another three years. KiwiRail Scenic Journeys said there would be maintenance and repairs for each of the carriages, at staggered intervals over the next 12 months, to improve the service.

In 2016 it was reported patronage on the service had increased for the first time in three years.

Historic Proposals
Proposals to improve the service have been made throughout the train's life. This includes one by Palmerston North City Councillor Chris Teo-Sherrell to terminate the service in Waikanae to connect to the Kapiti Tranz Metro services, and another by Palmerston North Mayor Grant Smith to double the daily frequency. Neither of these proposals were adopted.

Operator

From 1991 the train was operated by New Zealand Rail suburban passenger division CityRail, which was re-branded Tranz Metro in 1995 when New Zealand Rail itself was rebranded Tranz Rail. In 2001, with the partial sale of Tranz Scenic (the long-distance passenger division of Tranz Rail), the company sought to separate its commercial passenger rail operations from its subsidised services (which remained in Wellington under Tranz Metro), operation of the train was transferred to Tranz Scenic. KiwiRail is the current operator of the service.

Service
The train operates Monday-Friday from Palmerston North to Wellington in the morning, returning in the evening. The service stops at 5 stations within the Wellington and Manawatu-Whanganui regions.

Weekend services
On Sunday 19 June 1994 a weekend service from Palmerston North to Wellington and return started. The power/baggage van, catering car and 50-seat (alcove-style with tables) day car (ex Masterton) made up the consist. It attracted minimal patronage and was withdrawn later that year.

Future 
In 2019, the GWRC proposed replacing the Capital Connection and Wairarapa Connection trains with 15 four-car bi-mode multiple units by 2025. These trains are estimated to cost $415 million.

The "infrastructure spendup" announced on 30 January 2020 included some upgrading of the present rolling stock but not the proposed hybrid trains (see New Zealand Upgrade Programme).

For the future of KiwiRail's regional passenger rail services, the Capital Connection and Te Huia (2022) see:

2021-2031 Expansion 
The 2021-2031 Horizons Regional Land Transport Plan recognised the importance of the service to the region and the environment, and stated that the service would need to be upgraded if it was to continue past 2025. The Plan states that the carriages and locomotives are undergoing significant updating to meet modern standards. The Plan also provides for higher frequency of trains, utilising a larger fleet of trains and updated stations. The Plan states that buses may be able to connect regional towns to this upgraded service. A detailed business case is being created to analyse any improvements.

The Horizons Plan also noted that Kiwi Rail is investigating an inter-regional connector service, which would connect districts to urban services. Horizons note that there is opportunity to create a Whanganui - Palmerston North train service akin to this inter-regional proposal.

The service's rolling stock was refurbished in 2022/2023 at the Hutt Workshops. The carriages left the workshop on the 22nd of February 2023 for Palmerston North. The new set includes six S class coaches, refurbished in a Suburban Regional (SR) style similar to Te Huia (including SR5968), and a refurbished baggage carriage (AG176).

Rolling stock and motive power

The service began using standard NZR 56-foot carriages: the first of two power-baggage vans from the Bay Express, a 50-seat Southerner car, a 42-seat Northerner car and a 37-seat Northerner catering car. When the Northerner and Southerner cars were returned to their respective trains and patronage continued to increase a former Masterton commuter car was refurbished to the same standard, with the same 50 alcove-style seats as the Southerner car, but with sheepskin seat covers.

Later, a former Endeavour car with luggage space at one end and a former Picton – Greymouth car, both from on the Masterton commuter run, were refurbished for the service. Later still, up to five more Masterton cars, a Northerner car, the second Northerner catering car and the sole InterCity spare buffet car saw service. Before these carriages were replaced, the service was regularly running with a van and eight cars.

British Rail carriages

On Monday 15 November 1999 a new train entered service, made up of seven (later eight) British Rail Mark 2 cars and the second former Southerner modular 11 kW power and baggage van, with 90 kW generator and larger luggage space made up from the middle and expanded non-handbrake end compartments. The new cars are about three metres longer than the older cars and more spacious inside, with more headroom, full air-conditioning, 60 seats per car (28 in the servery car), and twin power sockets at the foot of each pair of seats. Seating arrangement is both alcove and airline-style, using their British Rail InterCity 72 seats. Since October 2016, fire suppressed DFB class locomotives have been assigned to the service.

They have been repainted from Tranz Scenic standard "Cato blue" into Capital Connection livery.

12 former Maxx /Auckland Transport SA class used on the Auckland Suburban network have been relocated from storage in Tauramanui. They are currently being refurbished to a similar design of the new Te Huia Hamilton to Auckland train under the Upgrade New Zealand Programme. The 12 refurbished carriages will enter service in 2022. with component delivery delays, now mid 2023. A near complete and painted overhauled carriage SR6010 was shown to journalists.

Capital Connection 1999 S class

Capital Connection 2023 SR (Regional) class

Future Rolling Stock
See re new trains Public transport in the Wellington Region

In 2019, the GWRC proposed replacing in 2025 the Capital Connection and Wairarapa Connection trains with 15 four-car dual-mode multiple units, to operate from overhead power from Wellington to Upper Hutt or an on-board power source north of Upper Hutt; to cost $415 million.

In 2022 a business case for extending the Kapiti Line as far as Levin was pushed for by transport minister Michael Wood;  adding an extra 35 km to the line to (or past) Ōtaki.

See also
 Tranz Scenic
 Wellington railway station
 Tranz Metro

References

External links
 Capital Connection website

Long-distance passenger trains in New Zealand
Railway services introduced in 1991
Named passenger trains of New Zealand
1991 establishments in New Zealand